Eddie Cheeba was a pioneering DJ in New York in the 1970s, considered to be the number one club DJ.

Cheeba was a close friend of DJ Hollywood and they frequently influenced each other's styles.

Cheeba is credited with inspiring Def Jam Recordings founder, Russell Simmons to pursue a career in hip-hop when Simmons heard Cheeba perform in Harlem in 1977.

Kurtis Blow took his name imitating Cheeba at the suggestion of Russell Simmons, copying the pattern from Eddie Cheeba as "blow" was slang for cocaine as "cheeba" was slang for marijuana.

References

American hip hop DJs
African-American rappers